Eugen Schileru (pen name of Eugen Schiller; September 13, 1916–August 10, 1968) was a Romanian art and literary critic, essayist and translator.

Born in Brăila, his parents were Henri Schiller, an otorhinolaryngologist, and his wife Maria (née Demetrescu); his father was Jewish and his mother ethnic Romanian. He attended Nicolae Bălcescu High School in his native city from 1930 to 1934, followed by the literature and philosophy faculty of the University of Bucharest from 1934 to 1938. Schileru graduated with a degree in aesthetics; his thesis dealt with art and pathological manifestations. One of his professors was George Oprescu. In 1939, he received a law degree. Under the pen name Adrian Schileru, he published in the Marxist review Era nouă in 1936. In 1938, he received a vacation scholarship from the French Institute of Advanced Studies in Romania; also that year, he graduated from a pedagogical institute. From 1948 to 1951, he directed the Romanian Academy's library. In 1949, he became a professor of aesthetics at Bucharest's Nicolae Grigorescu Fine Arts Institute, rising to chairman of the art history department in 1968.

Schileru's writings include articles in literary and specialty magazines; short works on fine arts (exhibition catalogues, art columns, aesthetic commentaries, notes about impressionism, classical and contemporary painting); film reviews; theoretical works about art; and commentaries partly collected in Rembrandt (1966), Ion Sima (1968), Ion Irimescu (1969), Impresionismul (1969), Scrisoarea de dragoste (1971) and Preludii critice (1975). He prefaced translations from Antoine de Saint-Exupéry, Thomas Mann, Herman Melville, Alberto Moravia and Cesare Pavese, while himself translating, alone or in collaboration, Sinclair Lewis, James Hilton, Horace McCoy, Giovanni Germanetto, André Ribard, Claude Lévi-Strauss, Albert Maltz, Richard Sasuly and Tirso de Molina.

He was married to Simona Schileru (1916–1964). His daughter Micaela published a memoir of her father in 2016, the centenary of his birth.

Notes

1916 births
1968 deaths
People from Brăila
Romanian people of Jewish descent
University of Bucharest alumni
Academic staff of the Bucharest National University of Arts
Romanian art critics
Romanian film critics
Romanian translators
Romanian librarians
20th-century translators
Burials at Bellu Cemetery